Rockfish Township was an unincorporated township in Cumberland County, North Carolina. The population was 55,819 at the 2010 census.

In 2009 the City of Fayetteville, North Carolina annexed 'Rockfish Township'.

References

Townships in Cumberland County, North Carolina